Jack Linkletter (November 20, 1937 – December 18, 2007) was an American game show and television host and entertainer. He was the son of Art Linkletter.

Early life
Linkletter was born Arthur Jack Linkletter in San Francisco. He was the oldest of Lois and Art Linkletter's five children. He was said to have been inspired to enter show business by his father's show House Party.

As a boy, Mr. Linkletter inspired one of his father's most famous "House Party" routines: interviewing young children.

Linkletter was an English major at the University of Southern California in 1958 when he began hosting the NBC-TV prime-time summer replacement quiz show Haggis Baggis.

Career
At 15, Linkletter began doing an interview show for CBS Radio, which was soon followed in 1954 by an hour-long program featuring records and stunts called "Teen Club".

Linkletter hosted seven television shows throughout his career, including Haggis Baggis,  Hootenanny, On the Go (1958–59) and Here's Hollywood. He also hosted a number of events and pageants, including the Miss Universe pageant, events for the World's Fair and many parades.

On February 23, 1961, Linkletter and his father, Art, appeared together in "The Bible Man", one of the final episodes of Dick Powell's Zane Grey Theatre, which aired for five seasons on CBS. In the story line, the father, the Reverend Albert Pierce, is a traveling evangelist who is estranged from his grown son, Jimmy, because he had tried to avoid telling Jimmy of the real circumstances of his mother's death. The son accused his father of causing the mother's death by burning down her house. However, she was already dead before the fire because a paramour had beaten her to death. The episode ends in a reconciliation of father and son. "The Bible Man" was Jack Linkletter's only regular acting appearance. When on television, he otherwise played himself. Linkletter's last major television role was as the main host of the daily NBC daytime talk/variety program, America Alive! in 1978.

Linkletter was president of Linkletter Enterprises, developer and operator of commercial and industrial real estate and manager of diversified family investments. He also operated the Link Fund, a private fund investing in equity and debt instruments.  Linkletter served as the International President of Young Presidents' Organization and national director of the 4-H Clubs.

Death
Linkletter died of lymphoma on December 18, 2007, at his home in Cloverdale, California. He was 70 years old.

References

External links
 

1937 births
2007 deaths
Deaths from lymphoma
Television personalities from California
Deaths from cancer in California
People from Cloverdale, California